Janine Tagliante-Saracino is an ambassador for the Ivory Coast who has served in Bulgaria, Italy and Malta.  She is also a professor of Public Health.

References

Women ambassadors
Ambassadors of Ivory Coast to Malta
Ambassadors of Ivory Coast to Bulgaria
Ambassadors of Ivory Coast to Italy
Year of birth missing (living people)
Living people
Place of birth missing (living people)